Omnicell, Inc. is an American multinational healthcare technology company headquartered in Mountain View, California. It manufactures automated systems for medication management in hospitals and other healthcare settings, and medication adherence packaging and patient engagement software used by retail pharmacies. Its products are sold under the brand names Omnicell and EnlivenHealth.

Company history

1992–1999 
Omnicell Technologies, Inc. was founded in September 1992 by Randall A. Lipps after his daughter was hospitalized at birth and he observed nurses had difficulty locating medical supplies. With the help of graduate students from Stanford University, he developed a prototype of a system that automated inventory management tasks performed manually by nurses.

With Lipps as the chairman of the company, it commercially began developing automated supply cabinets in 1993. The cabinets were capable of tracking transaction data, inventory levels, expenses, and patient billing. Sales figures reached $7.7 million by the end of 1995 and increased the following year to $21.5 million. The company expanded services by developing pharmacy automation systems for dispensing medications in 1996. They expanded their product line in 1999 by acquiring the SureMed line of pharmacy cabinets from Baxter Healthcare Corp.

2000–2020 
By the end of the 1990s, the company had installed more than 14,000 automated dispensing cabinets in more than 1,300 healthcare facilities, and sales grew to $50 million. Omnicell went public in August 2001, changing the company’s name to Omnicell, Inc.

In 2002 Lipps assumed the role of CEO, replacing Sheldon D. Asher. In 2003, Omnicell acquired BCX Technology, Inc., a maker of wireless, handheld bar-code scanners that could track pharmaceutical dispensation. The company further expanded with more acquisitions. Its purchase of MTS Technologies added multiple-dose medication blister cards used by retail pharmacies to encourage medication adherence. The acquisition of Aesynt Inc. added pharmacy robots for inventory management, specialized IV compounding robots to remove human error, and pharmacy data intelligence software. The acquisition of Ateb, Inc., which provided patient engagement and patient communication systems to retail pharmacies, led to the formation of the EnlivenHealth business segment in 2020.

Acquisitions and partnerships

 2012 – MTS Medication Technologies, Inc., a global medication adherence packaging systems provider
 2014 – UK-based SurgiChem Limited, a wholly-owned subsidiary of Care Homes (CFG), for £12,000,000 in a cash transaction
 2015 – Germany-based Mach4 Pharma Systems, a robotic dispensing systems provider
 2015 – Partnered with Avantec for distribution of Omnicell products in UK
 2016 – Acquired medication technology company Aesynt Inc. for $275 million, adding central pharmacy dispensing robotics, IV compounding robotics, and pharmacy data analytics to the company’s services
 2016 – Acquired Ateb, Inc., together with its Canadian affiliate, Ateb Canada Ltd, providers of pharmacy-based patient care solutions and medication synchronization to independent and chain pharmacies 
 2017 – InPharmics, a Mississippi-based technology and services company that provides advanced pharmacy informatics solutions to hospital pharmacies
 2020 – Acquired the 340B Link business of Pharmaceutical Strategies Group (PSG)
 2021 – Partnership with Guy’s and St Thomas’ NHS Foundation Trust, London to develop technology-enabled inventory optimization and intelligence services

Finances

References

External links

American companies established in 1992
Health care companies based in California
Technology companies based in the San Francisco Bay Area
2001 initial public offerings
Companies listed on the Nasdaq